Hertz Corp. v. Friend, 559 U.S. 77 (2010), was a United States Supreme Court case in which the Court supported the "nerve center" test for determining corporate citizenship in the context of 28 U.S.C. § 1332. Hertz Corp believed that the case brought forward could not be tried in California jurisdiction and therefore hoped a case in a California court would be thrown out.  However, the state court ruled that there was California jurisdiction that was appropriate and re-established the importance of the "place of operations" test for firms.  The Supreme Court overruled but cautioned that the corporate headquarters will not be considered the principal place of business if it is not the actual center of direction, control, and coordination, such as if it were “simply an office where the corporation holds its board meetings."

Background
In September 2007, respondents Melinda Friend and John Nhieu, both citizens of California, sued the Hertz Corporation in a California Court, seeking damages for what was claimed to be a violation of California's wage and hour laws on behalf of a number of Californians who had allegedly experienced similar damages.

Hertz petitioned to move the case to a federal court, claiming that the two parties were citizens of different states and therefore diversity-of-citizenship was relevant.  To further support this claim, Hertz provided details showing that its operations were primarily in New Jersey and that its California operations were minor and did not constitute as its principal place of business.

Initially the court ruled that California was certainly a place of major business for Hertz, since a large amount of its revenue and income came from the state, and thus declared it was liable under California jurisdiction.  However, a subsequent ruling for a case involving Best Buy declared that Best Buy was not a citizen of California, despite similar circumstances and even less overall operations in the state.  After this Hertz petitioned for a writ of Certiorari which the court granted.

Case
Hertz was responsible for proving to the court that they were, indeed, not a California citizen to be entitled to a Federal court rather than a California court.  The court therefore sought to resolve the different interpretations that the various circuit courts had given up to that point.

The difficulty of the case came in determining the scope of “principal place of business”, as the previous cases and statutes on the subject offered no concrete guidance.  Even looking at a series of historical cases, the court could not find anything conclusive.  The court could not find any compelling evidence to support either the “Nerve Center” or “Place of Operations” method and continued its deliberation.

The court eventually narrowed the two interpretations down to “nerve center” referring to the place of chief coordination of operations and “place of operations” referring to place generating the most significant revenues.  Even after this conclusive finding, the answer was still unclear.

Decision
The court decided that, although California operations were significant, they were not large enough for Hertz to be considered a California citizen; that is California was not Hertz' primary place of business generating a majority of its revenues.  Therefore, the court ruled that New Jersey was in fact the “Nerve Center” of Hertz where all its operations were headquartered, and thus it was entitled to a Federal Court through Diversity-of-Citizenship.  However, although Hertz was granted their petition successfully, the case was not over and then went on to a Federal court where the proceedings were heard and finished for the initial case.

Significance
This case established much of the protocol still used by the courts today in determining the citizenship of a corporation in diversity-of-citizenship cases.  It established a more loose code, rather than a uniform one, that examines both the “Nervous System” approach as well as the “Place of Operations” approach to reach a verdict.  This reasoning stems from the fact that all corporations are different and will have varying factors, levels of operations, and natures of headquarters that all may change its principal state of citizenship.  It is important to note that corporations can all have their own specific test to determine their citizenship.  However, it is also important to note that once a corporation has declared its citizenship to one state, it cannot make other claims in future cases of diversity-of-citizenship without severely altering either its chief place of operations or place of headquarters.

References

External links
 

United States Supreme Court cases
United States Supreme Court cases of the Roberts Court
Diversity jurisdiction case law
2010 in United States case law